Klippan (literally the Cliff, old ) is a locality and the seat of Klippan Municipality, Skåne County, Sweden with 8,116 inhabitants in 2010.

On September 1995, a young man named Gerard Gbeyo had been murdered by 2 Nazi sympathizers.

Famous people from Klippan 

 Bertil Ohlin
 Bertil Svensson

Sports
The following sports clubs are located in Klippan:

 Klippans FF

References 

Populated places in Klippan Municipality
Populated places in Skåne County
Municipal seats of Skåne County
Swedish municipal seats